Kimberly Belle (born 20 February 1968) is an international bestselling American novelist.

Life and career 
The daughter of a chemist and a speech pathologist, Belle grew up in Kingsport, Tennessee. She earned a BA from Agnes Scott College. Before she turned to writing fiction, Belle worked in marketing and fundraising for Habitat for Humanity, the YWCA, Annie E. Casey Foundation, and the United Way.

Works 
Belle is best known for her novel, The Marriage Lie (Mira, 2017), which was a USA Today, Wall Street Journal, and  a The Globe and Mail bestseller, as well as #1 iTunes UK bestseller and a semifinalist in the 2017 Goodreads Choice Awards for Best Mystery & Thriller and has been translated in a dozen languages. Dear Wife, her fifth novel, was published in June 2019.

The Last Breath, Mira  2014
The Ones We Trust, Mira  2015
The Marriage Lie, Mira  2017
Three Days Missing, Park Row Books  2018.
Dear Wife, Park Row Books, 2019
Stranger in the Lake, Park Row Books, 2020

Personal 
Belle and her husband, a Dutch real-estate entrepreneur, have two children. She currently divides her time between Atlanta and Amsterdam.

References

External links

American women novelists
Agnes Scott College alumni
Living people
1968 births
21st-century American women